Technorati was a search engine and a publisher advertising platform that served as an advertising solution for the thousands of websites in its network. Technorati launched its ad network in 2008, and at one time was one of the largest ad networks reaching more than 100 million unique visitors per month. The name Technorati was a portmanteau of the words technology and literati, which evokes the notion of technological intelligence or intellectualism.

In 2016, Synacor acquired Technorati for $3 million.

The company's core product was previously an Internet search engine for searching blogs. The website stopped indexing blogs and assigning authority scores in May 2014 with the launch of its new website, which is focused on online publishing and advertising. Technorati was founded by Dave Sifry, with its headquarters in San Francisco, California, USA. Kevin Marks was the site's Principal Engineer. Tantek Çelik was the site's Chief Technologist.

The site won the SXSW 2006 awards for Best Technical Achievement and Best of Show.  It was nominated for a 2006 Webby Award for Best Practices, but lost to Flickr and Google Maps.

Technology
Technorati used real-time market insights to optimize digital advertising interactions across its publisher network with the use of technology designed to help publishers get discovered by advertisers and earn more for their content.

Reception 
In February 2006, Debi Jones pointed out that Technorati's "State of the Blogosphere" postings, which then claimed to track 27.7 million blogs, did not take into account MySpace blogs, of which she said that there were 56 million.  As a result, she said that the utility of Technorati as a gauge of blog popularity was questionable. However, by March 2006, Aaron Brazell pointed out that Technorati had started tracking MySpace blogs.

In May 2006, Technorati teamed up with the PR agency Edelman. The deal earned a lot of criticism, both on principle and as a result of Edelman's 2006 fake blog scandals. Edelman and Technorati officially ended the deal in December 2006. That month, Oliver Reichenstein pointed out that the so-called "State of the Blogosphere" was more of a PR-tool and money maker for Edelman and Technorati than a reliable source, explaining in particular: a) why Technorati/Edelman's claim that "31% of the blogs are written in Japanese" was "bogus", and b) where the financial profit for the involved parties was in this.

In May 2007, Andrew Orlowski, writing for the tech tabloid The Register, criticized Technorati's May 2007 redesign. He suggested that Technorati had decided to focus more on returning image thumbnails rather than blog results. He also claimed that Technorati never quite worked correctly in the past and that the alleged refocus was "a tacit admission that it's given up on its original mission".

In August 2008, Technorati acquired the online magazine, Blogcritics, for an undisclosed sum of money. As a result, Blogcritic's founders – publisher Eric Olsen and technical director Phillip Winn – became full-time Technorati employees. One of the first collaborative ventures of the two entities was for Blogcritics writers to begin writing descriptions of Technorati tags.

In October 2008, Technorati acquired the online ad agency Adengage. Technorati CEO Richard Jalichandra wanted to use the AdEngage platform to expand Technorati Media's offering, starting with an expansion of their advertising business from higher traffic sites. The AdEngage
network added a reported 12 billion monthly impression growth to the Technorati Media Network.

In April 2009, Blogcritics underwent a complete site redesign and switched content management systems.

In 2009, Technorati decided to stop indexing blogs and sites in languages other than English in order to focus only on the English-language blogosphere. As a result, thousands of sites in various languages were no longer rated by the Technorati service. In 2014, Technorati stopped indexing blogs altogether, refocusing its efforts on its advertising business.

In 2016, Synacor acquired Technorati for $3 million.

See also
 Folksonomy
 Social network aggregation
 Social bookmarking
 List of social bookmarking websites
 Models of collaborative tagging
 Tag (metadata)
 Crowdsourcing
 Web 2.0

References

External links
 Technorati Home Page
 Technorati management team official page, reference for much of the above
 Giga OM's entry on the end of the Technorati-Edelman deal
 Technorati's 2008 State of the Blogosphere Report

Blog search engines
Online advertising
Social bookmarking websites
Folksonomy
Defunct websites
Discontinued web annotation systems
Defunct social networking services
News aggregators
Web 2.0